Hervé Jamar is a Belgian politician. He is a member of the Reformist Movement (MR). He was mayor of Hannut from 1995 to 2014. He became Belgium's Minister of Budget in 2014 but resigned in 2015 in order to become Governor of the Province of Liège.

References

Living people
1965 births
20th-century Belgian politicians
21st-century Belgian politicians
Governors of Liège Province